

Greater Poland Voivodeship

Kuyavian-Pomeranian Voivodeship

Łódź Voivodeship

Lower Silesian Voivodeship

Lublin Voivodeship

Lubusz Voivodeship

Masovian Voivodeship

Opole Voivodeship

Podlaskie Voivodeship

Pomeranian Voivodeship

Silesian Voivodeship

Subcarpathian Voivodeship

Świętokrzyskie Voivodeship

Warmian-Masurian Voivodeship

West Pomeranian Voivodeship

Notes

Known building dates are in bold text. Non-bold text denotes first known date.

References

External links 
 Historia Wiatraków (Polish)
 Windmills in Greater Poland Voivodeship (Polish)
 List of Polish windmills

Poland

Windmills